Phaansi (ISO 15919:  Phāṁsī ) is a 1978 Indian Hindi-language movie directed by Harmesh Malhotra. The film stars Shashi Kapoor, Sulakshana Pandit, Pran and Ranjeet. The film's music is by Laxmikant Pyarelal. Actor Asrani has also played a role as a Muslim guy in the movie who was a close friend to Shashi Kapoor. Actor Iftekhar played the role father to Shashi Kapoor. He was hanged to death by the villain (Ranjeet). Asrani was also hanged by the villain. After this movie, Ranjeet went to Nepal to find peace. He was deeply troubled mentally as he played the most brutal Daaku ever in Hindi movies. The movie was declared a hit due to its story line, drama, songs and great action. 
The song was playbacked by Mohd Rafi, Lata Mangeshkar and Sulakshana Pandit with music scored by Laxmikant-Pyarelal.

Soundtrack

External links 
 

1978 films
1970s Hindi-language films
Films scored by Laxmikant–Pyarelal
Films directed by Harmesh Malhotra